Estonia competed at the 1996 Summer Olympics in Atlanta, United States, its second entry as an independent nation since the breakup of the Soviet Union. 43 competitors, 35 men and 8 women, took part in 36 events in 13 sports.

Archery

Estonia sent the same archer to its second archery competition as it had sent to the first. Raul Kivilo lost his first match, but improved his ranking by 10 places from four years earlier.

Athletics

Men
Track & road events

Field events

Combined events – Men's decathlon

Women
Track & road events

Field events

Volleyball

Men's beach tournament

Canoeing

Sprint
Men

Cycling

Road

Track

Women's Sprint

Mountain biking

Fencing

Six fencers, three men and three women, represented Estonia in 1996.
Men

Women

Judo

Men

Modern pentathlon

Rowing

Men

Sailing

Estonia competed in three events in the Sailing competition of the Sydney Olympics.

Men

Women

Open

Shooting

Men

Swimming

Men

Wrestling

Men's freestyle

Men's Greco-Roman

Notes

References

External links
 EOK – Atlanta 1996 

Nations at the 1996 Summer Olympics
1996
1996 in Estonian sport